La Trinità della Cava, commonly known as Badia di Cava, is a Benedictine territorial abbey located near Cava de' Tirreni, in the province of Salerno, southern Italy. It stands in a gorge of the Finestre Hills.

History
It was founded in 1011 by Alferius of Pappacarbone, a noble of Salerno who became a Cluniac monk and had lived as a hermit in the vicinity since 1011. Pope Urban II endowed this monastery with many privileges, making it immediately subject to the Holy See, with jurisdiction over the surrounding territory.

The first four abbots were canonized as saints on December 21, 1893, by Pope Leo XIII.

In 1394, Pope Boniface IX elevated it to a diocese, with the abbots functioning as bishops. In 1513, Pope Leo X separated the two offices, detaching the city of Cava from the abbot's jurisdiction. About the same time the Cluniacs were replaced by Cassinese monks.<ref>Catholic Encyclopedia, "Abbey of Trinita di Cava Dei Tirreni" (1913).</ref>

The monastery was closed under Napoleon but the community remained relatively unscathed, thanks to Abbot Carlo Mazzacane, and was restored after his fall. The abbey still provides the surrounding parishes with clergy.

The church and the greater part of the buildings were entirely modernized in 1796. The old Gothic cloisters are preserved. The church contains a fine organ and several ancient sarcophagi.

The church of the monastery has the tombs of Queen Sibylla of Burgundy (died 1150), second consort of King Roger II of Sicily, and a number of notable ecclesiastics.

Library
The monastery contains the Biblioteca statale del Monumento Nazionale Badia di Cava with its rich archives of public and private documents, which date back to the 8th century, e.g., the Codex Legum Longobardorum of 1004 (the oldest digest of Lombard law), and the La Cava Bible and fine incunabula''. The monastery later became the seat of a national educational establishment, under the care of the Benedictines.

Abbots

Saint Alferius of Pappacarbona (1011–1050)
Saint Leo I of Cava (1050–1079)
Saint Peter of Pappacarbone (1079–1122)
Saint Constabilis (1122–1124)
Blessed Simeon (1124–1140)
Blessed Falcone (1140–1146)
Blessed Marino (1146–1170)
Blessed Benincasa (1171–1194)
Rugger  Roger (1194)
Blessed Peter II (1195–1208)
Blessed Balsamo (1208–1232)
Blessed Leonard (1232–1255)
Blessed Leo II (1266–1295)
Philip de Haya (1316–1331)
Maynerio (1342–1366)

Bishop-Abbots
John of Aragon
Oliverio Carafa

Abbots

Crisostomo d'Alessandro (1512–1517)
Gerolamo Guevara (1528–1552)
Pellegrino Dell'Erre (1549–1550)
Vittorino Manso (1588–1592)
Giulio Vecchioni (1630–1633)
Gregorio Lottieri (1640–1642)
Giuseppe Lomellino (1647–1651)
Severino Boccia (1671–1677)
Gaetano Dattilo (1772–1778)
Raffaele Pasca (1781–1787)
Tommaso Capomazza (1793–1801)
Carlo Mazzacane (1801–1824)
Pietro Candida (1844–1849)
Onofrio Granata (1849–1858)
Michele Morcaldi (1878–1894)
Benedetto Bonazzi (1894–1902)
Silvano de Stefano (1902–1908)
Angelo Maria Ettinger (1910–1918)
Giuseppe Placido M. Nicolini (1919–1928)
Ildefonso Rea (1929–1945)
Mauro De Caro (1946–1956)
Fausto Mezza (1956–1967)
Michele Alfredo Marra (1969–1992)
Benedetto Maria Salvatore Chianetta (1995–2010)

See also
Cava de' Tirreni, Italy (Italia)
Alferius

References

External links

Official website

Churches in the province of Salerno
Benedictine monasteries in Italy
Cava de' Tirreni
1025 establishments in Europe
11th-century establishments in Italy
Christian monasteries established in the 11th century
Monasteries in Campania
Buildings and structures in the Province of Salerno